William James S. M. McClure (born 4 January 1958) more commonly known as Billy McClure, was an association footballer who represented New Zealand.

Club career
He played for Liverpool F.C. Reserves from 1974 to 1977.

In 1977, he became the first foreign player in Iranian Takht-e-Jamshid Professional Soccer League. He made 2 appearances for Tehran's giants Persepolis F.C. and scored one goal. However, he had difficulty making it to the starting lineups so he moved back to England.
He moved to New Zealand in 1979 and played for Mount Wellington in New Zealand from 1979 to 1997 with some years in between for Papatoetoe FC.

International career
McClure made his full All Whites debut in a 0–0 draw with India on 1 September 1981. Including friendlies he played 45 times for the All Whites, of which 30 appearances were official A-internationals in which he scored 5 goals, earning his final cap in a 2–1 win over Fiji on 19 September 1986.

He was a member of the All Whites at the 1982 FIFA World Cup in Spain
.

References

External links

1958 births
Living people
Footballers from Liverpool
English emigrants to New Zealand
English footballers
Persepolis F.C. players
Papatoetoe AFC players
Expatriate association footballers in New Zealand
Expatriate footballers in Iran
New Zealand expatriate sportspeople in England
1982 FIFA World Cup players
New Zealand association footballers
New Zealand international footballers
University-Mount Wellington players
Association football midfielders